Socialist Workers Party of Sweden (in Swedish: Sveriges Socialistiska Arbetarparti) was a small far-right political party in Sweden 1985-1991. Essentially it was a one-man outfit headed by Percy Brunström.

In 1991 the party contested the parliamentary elections in coalition with the Sweden Party, under the name Swedish Unity (Svensk Samling). SS got around 100 votes.

Later Brunström would launch the Citizens Party (Medborgarpartiet).

References

Political parties established in 1985
Defunct political parties in Sweden
1985 establishments in Sweden